Henry Matías Mier Codina (born 2 August 1990) is an Uruguayan professional footballer who plays as a left midfielder or attacking midfielder for Liga 1 club Bhayangkara.

Club career

Early career
Mier began his career at Rentistas in 2007 and transferred to Fénix in 2008. He left the club in December 2010 after the 2010 Apertura season.

Peñarol
Mier joined Peñarol in January 2011. On 3 June 2011 he scored a crucial away goal in a Copa Libertadores semi final clash against Vélez Sársfield of Argentina. Although Peñarol were defeated on the night 2–1, they progressed to the finals on the away goals rule as the aggregate score was 2–2 over after they had won the 1st leg 1–0 in Uruguay a week prior. Mier played both legs of the finals, where they lost 2–1 on aggregate to Santos.

Universidad Católica
On 18 July 2011, it was reported that Argentine Primera División club Racing Club were interested in purchasing Mier for the next season, because Mariano González recommended the player to Racing manager Diego Simeone.

Two days later, on 20 July, Chilean Primera División club Universidad Católica signed Mier on a three-year contract, which would keep him at the club until 2014. On 22 July, he was officially presented during a press conference. He made his Primera División debut against Deportes Iquique, and his first goal came on 13 August in a 4–0 win over Unión La Calera.

In November 2011, Mier won his first trophy as a professional when Universidad Católica won the 2011 Copa Chile, beating Deportes Magallanes on penalties in the finals.

Muaither SC
On 12 June 2016, Mier joined Qatar Stars League club Muaither and only made 2 appearances for the club before leaving.

Return to Peñarol
In 2017 he returned to Uruguay with Peñarol. On 28 April 2017, after Palmeiras beat Peñarol in the 2017 Copa Libertadores, there was a mass brawl, and Mier received a three match suspension for fighting Felipe Melo.

Junior 
In July 2017, Mier joined Colombian club Atlético Junior to play the 2017 Copa Sudamericana, 2017 Copa Colombia, 2017 Torneo Finalizacion. Mier played two matches in the knockout stages as Junior won the Copa Colombia, defeating Independiente Medellín 3–1 on aggregate in the final.

La Equidad 
On 22 June 2018, Mier joined Bogota-based club La Equidad. He scored his first goal on 9 October 2018, in a 3–2 win against Millonarios. On 3 April 2019, Mier scored his first goal of the 2019 Apertura in a 3–1 victory against América de Cali. Four days later, he scored the opening goal in a 2–2 draw against his former club, Junior. Mier scored a goal in the Copa Sudamericana quarter-finals against Atletico Mineiro to put the match 1–1. However, Mineiro won the match 3–1 and eliminated La Equidad from the tournament on 28 August.  On 14 September 2019, Mier scored the only goal in a victory against Patriotas Boyacá. Mier scored three more goals in the 2019 Finalizacion tournament, against America de Cali, Patriotas again, and Cúcuta Deportivo.

Mier had a great individual season in the 2020 Categoría Primera A season, where he scored 10 goals in 19 appearances. His first two goals came in a 4–1 victory against Cucuta on 23 February. He scored another two goals, including an Olympic goal, in a 4–0 victory against Boyaca Chico. In October, he scored goals in victories against Independiente Medellin and Deportes Tolima, before adding his third brace of the season in a 2–1 victory against America at Estadio Pascual Guerrero, which helped his team secure qualification for the playoffs in the last round.

Independiente Medellin 
Mier was announced as an Independiente Medellín player on 18 December 2020.

Independiente Santa Fe 
In January 2022, Mier signed with Independiente Santa Fe, quickly becoming an integral part of the Lion’s sporting project, providing many goals and goal assists for the highlight reels.

Honours

Club

Universidad Católica 

 Copa Chile: 2011

Junior 
 Copa Colombia: 2017

Independiente Medellin 

 Copa Colombia: 2020

References

External links
  (archive 1, archive 2)
 

1990 births
Living people
Footballers from Montevideo
Uruguayan footballers
Uruguayan expatriate footballers
C.A. Rentistas players
Peñarol players
Centro Atlético Fénix players
Muaither SC players
Santiago Wanderers footballers
Club Deportivo Universidad Católica footballers
Atlético Junior footballers
La Equidad footballers
Independiente Medellín footballers
Central Córdoba de Santiago del Estero footballers
Independiente Santa Fe footballers
Bhayangkara F.C. players
Chilean Primera División players
Qatar Stars League players
Uruguayan Primera División players
Categoría Primera A players
Argentine Primera División players
Liga 1 (Indonesia) players
Association football midfielders
Uruguayan expatriate sportspeople in Chile
Uruguayan expatriate sportspeople in Qatar
Uruguayan expatriate sportspeople in Colombia
Uruguayan expatriate sportspeople in Argentina
Uruguayan expatriate sportspeople in Indonesia
Expatriate footballers in Chile
Expatriate footballers in Qatar
Expatriate footballers in Colombia
Expatriate footballers in Argentina
Expatriate footballers in Indonesia